The 2023 EnBW DTB Pokal Team Challenge and Mixed Cup is an upcoming artistic gymnastics competition to be held on March 17–19, 2023 at the Porsche-Arena in Stuttgart, Germany. The event consists of five separate competitions across three days: a Team Challenge competition for both senior men and women; a Team Challenge for junior men and women; and a Mixed Team cup which will be contested between mixed gender senior teams from Brazil, Germany, Japan and the United States.

Schedule

Medalists

Senior

Junior

Participants 

Notes on participating nations:  are listed on promotional materials but not on any start lists.

References 

DTB
DTB
International gymnastics competitions hosted by Germany
DTB